The 1928 St. Louis Stars baseball team represented the St. Louis Stars in the Negro National League during the 1928 baseball season.  The Stars won the Negro National League championship. The team played its home games at Stars Park in St. Louis.

Three players from the 1928 team were later inducted into the Baseball Hall of Fame: center fielder Cool Papa Bell; first baseman Mule Suttles; and shortstop Willie Wells.

The team's leading batters were:
 Willie Wells - .365 batting average, .699 slugging percentage, 23 home runs, 360 plate appearances
 Mule Suttles - .361 batting average, .687 slugging percentage, 20 home runs, 342 plate appearances
 Wilson Redus - .330 batting average, .612 slugging percentage, 20 home runs, 351 plate appearances
 Cool Papa Bell - .320 batting average, .453 slugging percentage, four home runs, 387 plate appearances

The team's leading pitchers were Ted Trent (20-4 record in 205 innings pitched) and Logan Hensley (12-5 record in 144 innings pitched.

References

1928 in sports in Missouri
Negro league baseball seasons
St. Louis Stars (baseball)